Change of Plans (literally, "The Code Has Changed," referring to the entry code for the outer door of the apartment complex where much of the film takes place) is a 2009 French film directed and written by Danièle Thompson.

Plot
The film is centered around a dinner that takes place every year between a group of Parisian friends during the "Fête de la Musique". Piotr, the husband of Marie-Laurence, who is an overworked lawyer, is on sabbatical leave so it is up to him to organise the dinner party. The dinner does not go as planned: Lucas quarrels with his wife Sarah, Melanie decides that this is the perfect time to confess her extra-marital affair to her husband Alain. Juliette, Marie-Laurence's sister, comes with a surprise guest, Erwann her new companion, who is thirty years older than her. The arrival of Henri, the father of Juliette and Marie-Laurence, is a further upheaval because Juliette is not on speaking terms with him.

Cast
 Karin Viard as Marie-Laurence 'ML' Claverne
 Dany Boon as Piotr
 Marina Foïs as Mélanie Carcassonne
 Patrick Bruel as Doctor Alain Carcassonne
 Emmanuelle Seigner as Sarah Mattei
 Christopher Thompson as Lucas Mattei
 Marina Hands as Juliette
 Patrick Chesnais as Erwann
 Blanca Li as Manuela
 Laurent Stocker as Jean-Louis Mauzard
 Pierre Arditi as Henri
 Jeanne Raimbault as Doris
 Marc Rioufol as Daniel Laurent
 Isabelle Cagnat as Madame Bollet
 Michèle Brousse as Madame Andrieux
 Michel Motu as M. Andrieux
 Guillaume Durand as himself

References

External links
 

2009 films
French comedy-drama films
2000s French-language films
Films directed by Danièle Thompson
Films scored by Nicola Piovani
2000s French films